Comodoro D. Ricardo Salomón Airport is an airport serving Malargüe, a city in the Mendoza Province of Argentina. The airport is in the southeastern corner of the city, and is an access to Las Leñas ski resort.

The airport was built in 1947, and re-constructed in 1983. Since 1999, it has been operated by Aeropuertos Argentina 2000. It has a  passenger terminal and parking space for 70 cars.

There is distant rising terrain to the west. Runway length includes a  aligned taxiway and a  displaced threshold on Runway 14. The former Runway 09/27 is marked closed.

Airlines and destinations

See also

Transport in Argentina
List of airports in Argentina

References

External links 

Airports in Mendoza Province